Sophie Tolchard (born 2 October 1991) is an English international lawn bowler.

Bowls career

World Championships
In 2016, she won a pairs bronze medal with Ellen Falkner at the 2016 World Outdoor Bowls Championship in Christchurch.

Commonwealth Games
Sophie has competed at three Commonwealth Games for England. The first in the women's triples at the 2014 Commonwealth Games, where she won a gold medal with partners Ellen Falkner and Sian Gordon. The second was in 2018, when she was selected as part of the English team for the 2018 Commonwealth Games on the Gold Coast in Queensland.

In 2022, she competed in the women's pairs and the Women's fours at the 2022 Commonwealth Games. In the pairs with Amy Pharaoh she secured a silver medal.

Atlantic Bowls Championship
In 2015, she won the triples silver medal at the Atlantic Bowls Championships. In 2020, she was selected for the 2020 World Outdoor Bowls Championship in Australia.

National Championships
She has won nine National Championships, three of which have been in the National singles. The recent successes were in 2018 when she beat Amy Gowshall in the singles and was also part of the winning fours, the 2019 Two wood singles, the 2021 triples, with Harriet Stevens and Emma Cooper and the 2022 pairs with Stevens.

Personal life
She is the sister of England international bowler Sam Tolchard.

References

1991 births
Living people
Bowls players at the 2014 Commonwealth Games
Bowls players at the 2018 Commonwealth Games
Bowls players at the 2022 Commonwealth Games
Commonwealth Games gold medallists for England
Commonwealth Games silver medallists for England
English female bowls players
Sportspeople from Torquay
Commonwealth Games medallists in lawn bowls
Medallists at the 2014 Commonwealth Games
Medallists at the 2022 Commonwealth Games